William Archer Amherst, 3rd Earl Amherst (26 March 1836 – 14 August 1910), styled Viscount Holmesdale from 1857 to 1886, was a British peer, politician and notable Freemason.

He was born in Mayfair, London, the son of William Amherst, Viscount Holmesdale (later 2nd Earl Amherst) and was baptised on 3 May 1836 in St. George's Church, Hanover Square, London. He was educated at Eton and went on to serve with the Coldstream Guards, rising to the rank of captain and fighting in the Battle of Balaclava, the Battle of Inkerman (where he was severely wounded) and the Siege of Sevastopol during the Crimean War.

On his return from the Crimea, Holmesdale was elected Member of Parliament (MP) for West Kent at the 1859 general election. On 27 August 1862, he married Julia Mann (the only daughter of the James Mann, 5th Earl Cornwallis) in Linton, Kent.

In 1868 Holmesdale became MP for the new Mid Kent constituency, which he represented until 1880.  He served as chairman of the National Union of Conservative and Constitutional Associations in 1868. On the death of his father in 1886, he became Earl Amherst. Julia died in 1883, and on 25 April 1889 he married Alice Vaughan, widow of Ernest Vaughan, 5th Earl of Lisburne in London.

He died in 1910, aged 74, at his home of Montreal Park, near Sevenoaks, Kent as a result of an operation he received three months prior for a throat infection. He was cremated on 16 August 1910 and his ashes buried two days later in nearby Riverhead. Despite having married twice, the earl died childless and his titles passed to his brother, Hugh.

References

External links 
 

Earls Amherst
Knights of Justice of the Order of St John
1836 births
1910 deaths
Coldstream Guards officers
British Army personnel of the Crimean War
Grand Masters of the United Grand Lodge of England
People from Mayfair
Members of the Parliament of the United Kingdom for English constituencies
People educated at Eton College
UK MPs 1859–1865
UK MPs 1865–1868
UK MPs 1868–1874
UK MPs 1874–1880
UK MPs who inherited peerages
Freemasons of the United Grand Lodge of England
People from Sevenoaks